Madonna Isabelle Gimotea (born October 6, 1974 in North York, Ontario) is a retired gymnast from Canada, who competed for her native country in the rhythmic gymnastics competition at the 1992 Summer Olympics. She won a total number of three medals at the 1991 Pan American Games in Havana, Cuba, and five at the 1990 Commonwealth Games in Auckland, New Zealand.

References
sports-reference

1974 births
Living people
Canadian rhythmic gymnasts
Gymnasts at the 1991 Pan American Games
Gymnasts at the 1992 Summer Olympics
Gymnasts at the 1990 Commonwealth Games
Commonwealth Games gold medallists for Canada
Commonwealth Games silver medallists for Canada
Olympic gymnasts of Canada
Sportspeople from North York
Gymnasts from Toronto
Pan American Games gold medalists for Canada
Pan American Games bronze medalists for Canada
Commonwealth Games medallists in gymnastics
Pan American Games medalists in gymnastics
Medalists at the 1991 Pan American Games
20th-century Canadian women
21st-century Canadian women
Medallists at the 1990 Commonwealth Games